Steven Johnson Leyba (born September 3, 1966) is an American artist, painter, fine art book maker, author, spoken word performance artist, and musician. Leyba is of  Mescalero Apache, Navajo, Cherokee, Paiute, Menominee, Jewish ancestry. He has been called the father of “Sexpressionism” by art critic Carlo McCormick. 

His work has been criticized for reclamation and use of the swastika symbol and sexual imagery for the purposes of public discourse. 

In 1992 he was made a Reverend in the Church of Satan by Anton LaVey. In 2007 started the first church of art the Coyotel Church "first church of creative application."

Work 
Leyba’s mixed media paintings utilize photographic collage, acrylic paint, oil paint, beadwork, as well as human blood. Leyba’s work attempts to 'liberate' human sexuality from commercialism. Using recontextualized images of human genitalia he emphasizes aesthetic notions of beauty and the politics of sexuality. 

His hand-made fine art books which can weigh up to seventy pounds consist of bound pages of paintings on canvas. 

His public performances consist of spoken word rants, cutting, piercing and extreme acts of degradation and sadomasochism. 

He has released three albums of spoken word and music as U.S.A.F. Two on Adversary Records: The Rev. Steven Johnson Leyba Presents: The United Satanic Apache Front, and Fuck Your Freedom. Third USAF album Code Hex AILMENTarius an anti Monsanto anti GMO album.

He has produced album covers for the bands Unveiled and Faggot.

Leyba is currently on mixmedia Book 16 : WATER

Lebya is also involved with a side musical project entitled Project #9, a collaboration of Leyba's spoken word, and a highly regarded artist by the name of Marly Preston. They have toured the west coast, and have released two albums together, entitled Final Year of Freedom and Covenant of the Blade. Currently working on third album Subwormian Blitzkrieg a double album is a call to war focusing on anti- global corporate fascism.

Inspiration 
Leyba is inspired by his ancestry Native American motifs such as the swastika, Apache Gahn Dancers, images of Native American warriors such as Geronimo, as well as the landscape of the human body.

Censorship 
In March 1997, his painting “Wounded Knee Decomposition” was censored by the KiMo Theater in Albuquerque, New Mexico during a Native American art exhibition held to raise money to allow American Indian prison inmates to hold and attend sweat lodge ceremonies. A special screen was set up to segregate his painting from the rest of the exhibit.

Fame 
In 1997, he performed his “Apache Whiskey Rite” before an audience of the San Francisco political establishment at the political consultant Jack Davis’ fiftieth birthday party. During the performance Leyba was sodomized by a woman wearing a bottle of Jack Daniels whiskey in a harness. The performance resulted in national media attention  including the front page of The New York Times, references in scholarly articles, and public debate. 

In 2002, he was the subject of the film documentary Unspeakable:The Life & Art of Reverend Steven Johnson Leyba,  by Marc Rokoff.

Books 
Leyba’s first book Coyote, Satan, Amerika was published by Last Gasp in 2001 and featured reviews of his work by William S. Burroughs, H.R. Giger, Poppy Z. Brite, Clive Barker, and others. His memoir The Last American Painter, with an introduction by Genesis P-Orridge was published by Coyotel Press in 2008. In 2009 Coyotel Press published his fine art book, Sexpressionist Portraits, and a collaboration with Dave Archer, Steve Hapy, and Will Taylor, The Trickster’s Bible.

Other media 
Leyba's painting of Todd Tamanend Clark shapeshifting into an owl is on the front cover of Clark's 2014 album Dancing Through The Side Worlds.

References

External links 
 

1966 births
Living people
American LaVeyan Satanists
American male artists
American male musicians
American male writers